Wangat River, a perennial river of the Hunter River catchment, is located in the Hunter region of New South Wales, Australia.

Course and features
Wangat River rises below Gloucester Tops, west of Gloucester Gap, within Barrington Tops National Park, and flows generally southeast and south before reaching its confluence with the Chichester River, southeast of Chichester within Lake Chichester. The river descends  over its  course.

See also

 Rivers of New South Wales
 List of rivers of Australia
 List of rivers of New South Wales (L–Z)

References

External links
 

Rivers of the Hunter Region
Dungog Shire
Hunter River (New South Wales)